Oxygene was a Pakistani musical, lifestyle and entertainment tv channel owned by Classic Entertainment Ltd
Its headquarter is in Karachi. It launched on 24 January 2009 as a premier music and lifestyle channel. The channel relaunched on March 4, 2013, with the slogan "Let's Breathe Young and the logo was re-updated. Apart from being shown in Pakistan it is also being broadcast in Bosnia and Herzegovina, UAE and Europe. It also promotes upcoming talent as new persons are often seen on Oxygene. And Now its Relaunched Oxygene For Bahira Town Islamabad Music Channel It Name Slogan Called Kyun Ke Oxygene Zaroori Hai i Shut Down in July 2021

Shows 
List of shows that air on Oxygene:

New Shows

 Zukhruf Khan – O2 Sports 
 Yumna Anis – Oxygene Channel Chart
 Uzma Azrar – Chalo Baat Karain
 Rasheed Safi – Sathwaan Din
 Ikraan Naqvi – Takraar

Old Shows
 Aftab Iqbal – Khabarzaar
 Hadiqa Kiani – Aap Kay Sitaray
 Agla Station
 Garma Garam With Aap Janab

Hall of Fame 
List of singers who their talent on Oxygene:

 Mohsin Abbas Haider
 Ali Pervez
 Sahir Ali Bagga
 Ammar Baig
 Waris Baig
 Navid 
 Yasir Akthar
 Soniya Haider
 Arif Lohar
 Wasi Shah

See also 
 List of music channels in Pakistan

References

External links 
 

Music television channels
Television networks in Pakistan
Television channels and stations established in 2009
Television stations in Pakistan
Television stations in Karachi
2019 disestablishments in Pakistan